This page shows the results of the 2012 Centrobasket Championship for Women, which was held in the city of Morovis, Puerto Rico from June 12 to June 16, 2012.

Group stage

Group A

Group B

Knockout stage

Bracket

5th place bracket

Classification 5-8

Semifinals

Seventh place game

Fifth place game

Third place game

Final

Final standings

References
FIBA Americas
Results

Centrobasket Women
2012–13 in North American basketball
2012 in women's basketball
2012 in Puerto Rican sports
International women's basketball competitions hosted by Puerto Rico
2012 in Central American sport
2012 in Caribbean sport